was a river gunboat of the Imperial Japanese Navy that operated on the Yangtze River in China during the 1930s, and during the Second Sino-Japanese War.

On 20 May 1933 Ataka was incorporated into the 3rd Fleet, as flagship of the 11th Gunboat Sentai.

Based in Shanghai during the Second Sino-Japanese War, Ataka was transferred to the Republic of China Navy after the war. She defected to the People's Liberation Army Navy in 1949, and was sunk in Wuhu by Nationalist aircraft on 23 September the same year.

References

Sources 
 Japanese gunboats (with photos) 
 Vessels of the IJN
  Monograph 144 Chapter II

Gunboats of the Imperial Japanese Navy
Second Sino-Japanese War naval ships of Japan
Gunboats sunk by aircraft
1922 ships
Ships built in Japan